The Toyota Raum is 5-seater mini MPV that first appeared in May 1997. The second generation was released in May 2003. It was sold only in Japan at Toyota Netz retail sales channels.

The vehicle's name is German for chamber, berth, room, space, expanse, scope, area, or sphere and attempts to emphasize the vast amount of space it contains relative to its size. This is because the front doors on both the driver and passenger sides open conventionally, but the rear doors slide open rearward and attach to the top and bottom of the door openings and interlock to the front doors. The Raum uses a similar door approach also used on the first-generation Mitsubishi RVR/Space Runner.

There is no doorjamb between the front and rear doors that the doors attach to on the passenger side, and the passenger front seat folds flat upon itself and then can be folded forward while still being attached to the floor at the front bottom of the seat. The rear seats can be folded flat with a 60:40 split or can also be folded forward individually for a rear flat cargo floor.

The automatic transmission gear selector is dashboard mounted, thereby freeing up the flat floor space between the front seats, allowing movement to the back seat from inside the vehicle.



First generation (XZ10; 1997–2003)

The development for the first generation Raum was led by Toyota chief engineer Tetsuya Tada. The Raum was equipped with EBD brakes on top level G and E packages, with a later addition to the C package. A minor facelift was released in August 1999.

Second generation (XZ20; 2003–2011) 

A complete body change was released on May 12, 2003 and shared the platform with the Toyota Vitz. Side impact protection was further enhanced. The passenger side rear door can be opened electronically and by remote control key fob. The engine used in the second-generation model is shared with the Toyota Prius.

On October 20, 2003, the vehicle won the Japan Good Design Award with a special mention for people with physical disabilities. A new trim level was added in 2004, called the C Package NEO Edition, (NEW ERA OPENING). The DVD navigational system was upgraded to HDD on December 5, 2006. On January 7, 2009, a in-car cabin air filter was added and HID headlamps.

For model year 2007 on Japanese models only, G-BOOK, a subscription telematics service, is offered as an option.

The front passenger seats on a Toyota Raum can be folded forward to allow passengers easier access to back seats, or can be used for rear passengers foot rest. To fold front passenger seat forward, the seat must slide back as far as possible to allow maximum leg room. Then simply lifting up the latch on the side of the seat should allow for the seat to be folded all the way forward.

References

Raum
Mini MPVs
Front-wheel-drive vehicles
All-wheel-drive vehicles
Cars introduced in 1997
2000s cars
2010s cars